Rowland Codling (22 February 1880–1954) was an English footballer who played in the Football League for Aston Villa, Clapton Orient, Manchester City and Stockport County.

References

1880 births
1956 deaths
English footballers
Association football midfielders
English Football League players
West Hartlepool F.C. players
Stockton St John's F.C. players
Swindon Town F.C. players
Sunderland A.F.C. players
Stockport County F.C. players
Leyton Orient F.C. players
Aston Villa F.C. players
Northampton Town F.C. players
Croydon Common F.C. players
Manchester City F.C. players
Merthyr Town F.C. players